Qəşəd (also, Kashad and Keshad) is a village and municipality in the Agsu Rayon of Azerbaijan.  It has a population of 1,096.

References 

Populated places in Agsu District